Michael R. Lovell (born  1967) is an American engineer and academic administrator, currently serving as President of Marquette University. Lovell assumed office on July 1, 2014.

Education
Lovell received his Bachelor of Science, Master of Science, and Ph.D in Mechanical Engineering from University of Pittsburgh.

Career 
Before joining Marquette University, he had served as the 8th chancellor for the University of Wisconsin–Milwaukee, having been named to that position by the UW System Board of Regents in April 2011. Lovell came to the University of Wisconsin–Milwaukee as its engineering school dean in 2008 and served as its interim chancellor after the departure of its former chancellor Carlos E. Santiago in 2010. He had previously been the Professor and Associate Dean for Research of the Swanson School of Engineering at the University of Pittsburgh.

Lovell has published more than 100 articles in leading engineering journals, has written a dozen book chapters and recently co-authored a book, Tribology for Scientists and Engineers. As a researcher, Lovell has been a lead or co-lead investigator for nearly $30 million in externally funded research grants from foundations, businesses and government agencies including the National Science Foundation, the Department of Energy, the Department of Defense and the Department of Education. His research has led to several technological breakthroughs, and he currently holds seven patents and 14 provisional patents. In 2013, Lovell was formally inducted into the National Academy of Inventors.

Awards

 NSF CAREER Award, Design Manufacturing and Industrial Innovation, 1997
 Outstanding International Publication on Bearings, FAG – Germany, 1997
 SME Outstanding Young Manufacturing Engineer Award, 1999
 ASME Burt L. Newkirk Award in Tribology, 2005
 Olympus Emerging Academic Innovator Award, 2006
 Fellow, American Society of Mechanical Engineers, 2008
 W. K. Whiteford Endowed Faculty Fellowship, 2000 – 2008
 State of Wisconsin Distinguished Professor, 2010–present
 Fellow of National Academy of Inventors, 2013

References

External links
 Profile at Marquette University
 Profile at UW-Milwaukee

1967 births
Living people
Presidents of Marquette University
Chancellors of the University of Wisconsin-Milwaukee
Swanson School of Engineering alumni
University of Pittsburgh faculty
Fellows of the American Society of Mechanical Engineers
Tribologists
American mechanical engineers
20th-century American engineers
21st-century American engineers
Fellows of the National Academy of Inventors
American university and college faculty deans